National Treasury Employees Union v. Von Raab, 489 U.S. 656 (1989), was a United States Supreme Court case involving the Fourth Amendment and its implication on drug testing programs. The majority of the Court upheld the drug testing program in the United States Customs Service.

Background
In 1986, the U.S. Customs Service imposed a drug testing program for "employees seeking transfer or promotion to positions having direct involvement in drug interdiction," required to carry firearms, or have access to classified information. The National Treasury Employees Union sued and alleged that the program was violative of the Fourth Amendment, which prohibits unreasonable search and seizure. The Court of Appeals for the Fifth Circuit ruled in favor of the government. The union then appealed to the Supreme Court. The Supreme Court upheld the Court of Appeals ruling with regard to positions involving drug interdiction and firearms. The ruling for classified information was held over, as the Supreme Court determined that the U.S. Customs Service too broadly included employee groups who would not generally have access to high levels of classified information.

Opinion of the Court
The Supreme Court upheld the Court of Appeals ruling with regard to positions involving drug interdiction and firearms. The ruling for classified information was held over, as the Supreme Court determined that the U.S. Customs Service too broadly included employee groups who would not generally have access to high levels of classified information.

The majority decision authored by Justice Kennedy upheld the constitutionality of the drug testing program, reasoning that Customs employees had a "diminished expectation of privacy." Justice Marshall wrote a dissent in which he was joined by Justice Brennan; Justice Scalia wrote a dissent in which Justice Stevens joined.

See also

Vernonia School District 47J v. Acton (1997) and Board of Education v. Earls (2002), later cases dealing with and upholding drug testing in schools rather than customs service.
Ferguson v. City of Charleston, a 2001 case stricking down drug test imposed on pregnant women in hospitals.
 List of United States Supreme Court cases, volume 489
 List of United States Supreme Court cases
 Lists of United States Supreme Court cases by volume
 List of United States Supreme Court cases by the Rehnquist Court

External links
 
National Drug Testing Laws & Guidelines

1989 in United States case law
United States controlled substances case law
United States Fourth Amendment case law
United States public employment trade union case law
United States Supreme Court cases
United States Supreme Court cases of the Rehnquist Court
Drug testing